Qadi Kola-ye Bozorg (also Romanized as Qādī Kolā-ye Bozorg; also known as Fādī Kolā-ye Bozorg and Qādī Kalā) is a village in Aliabad Rural District, in the Central District of Qaem Shahr County, Mazandaran Province, Iran. At the 2006 census, its population was 2,638, in 787 families.

References 

Populated places in Qaem Shahr County